The legislative districts of Iloilo are the representations of the province of Iloilo in the various national legislatures of the Philippines. The province is currently represented in the lower house of the Congress of the Philippines through its first, second, third, fourth and fifth congressional districts.

The highly urbanized city of Iloilo City and the province of Guimaras were last represented as part of Iloilo in 1986 and 1995, respectively.

History 
Iloilo was divided into five representative districts in 1907. Minor adjustments were made to the composition of the third, fourth, and fifth districts through Act No. 3036 enacted on March 9, 1922. When seats for the upper house of the Philippine Legislature were elected from territory-based districts between 1916 and 1935, the province formed part of the seventh senatorial district which elected two out of the 24-member senate.

In the disruption caused by the Second World War, two delegates represented the province in the National Assembly of the Japanese-sponsored Second Philippine Republic: one was the provincial governor (an ex officio member), while the other was elected through a provincial assembly of KALIBAPI members during the Japanese occupation of the Philippines. Iloilo City, being a chartered city, was represented separately in this short-lived legislative body. Upon the restoration of the Philippine Commonwealth in 1945, the province retained its five pre-war representative districts.

The province was represented in the Interim Batasang Pambansa as part of Region VI from 1978 to 1984. In 1984 the province elected five representatives, at large, to the Regular Batasang Pambansa.

The province, excluding the highly urbanized of city of Iloilo, was reapportioned into five congressional districts under the new Constitution which was proclaimed on February 11, 1987. The five districts elected members to the restored House of Representatives starting that same year. Iloilo City also elected its own representative in the 1987 election.

On May 22, 1992 the Provincial Board of Canvassers of Iloilo affirmed the results of the May 11, 1992 plebiscite on the proposed establishment of Guimaras (a sub-province of Iloilo since 1966) as a regular province by virtue of Section 462 of Republic Act No. 7160 (Local Government Code of 1991). Guimaras continued to be represented as part of the second district of Iloilo until it elected its own representative in the 1995 elections.

1st District 

Municipalities: Guimbal, Igbaras (re-established 1918), Miagao, Oton, San Joaquin (re-established 1910), Tigbauan, Tubungan (re-established 1938)
Population (2020): 374,726

2nd District 

Municipalities: Alimodian, Leganes, Leon, New Lucena, Pavia, San Miguel, Santa Barbara, Zarraga
Population (2020): 346,189

1907–1972 
Municipalities: Arevalo (merged into Iloilo City 1936), Buenavista, Iloilo (became city 1936), Jaro (re-established 1907, re-merged into Iloilo City 1940), Jordan (Nagaba) (re-established 1917), La Paz (re-established 1919, re-merged into Iloilo City 1936), Pavia (re-established 1921), Leganes (re-established 1939), Nueva Valencia (re-established 1941)

1987–1995 
Municipalities: Alimodian, Buenavista, Jordan, Leganes, Leon, New Lucena, Nueva Valencia, Pavia, San Miguel, Santa Barbara, Zarraga

3rd District 

Municipalities: Badiangan, Bingawan, Cabatuan, Calinog, Janiuay, Lambunao, Maasin, Mina, Pototan
Population (2020): 456,006

1907–1922 
Municipalities: Cabatuan, Leon, Santa Barbara, San Miguel (re-established 1915), Maasin (re-established 1918)

1922–1972 
Municipalities: Cabatuan, Janiuay, Alimodian, Leon, Maasin, San Miguel, Santa Barbara, Zarraga (re-established 1940), New Lucena (Lucena) (re-established 1946), Badiangan (established 1967)

4th District 

City: Passi (became city 1998)
Municipalities: Anilao, Banate, Barotac Nuevo, Dingle, Dueñas, Dumangas, San Enrique
Population (2020): 402,317

1907–1922 
Municipalities: Barotac Nuevo, Janiuay, Pototan, Dingle (re-established 1908), Dumangas (re-established 1911), Lambunao (re-established 1911)

1922–1972 
Municipalities: Barotac Nuevo, Calinog, Dingle, Dumangas, Lambunao, Pototan, Mina (re-established 1968), Bingawan (established 1969)

Notes

5th District 

Municipalities: Ajuy, Balasan, Barotac Viejo, Batad, Carles, Concepcion, Estancia, Lemery, San Dionisio, San Rafael, Sara
Population (2020): 472,661

1907–1922 
Municipalities: Balasan, Banate, Passi, Sara, Dueñas (re-established 1920), Ajuy (re-established 1916), Barotac Viejo (re-established 1918), Estancia (re-established 1918), Carles (re-established 1919), San Dionisio (re-established 1920), Calinog (re-established 1920), Concepcion (re-established 1920)

1922–1972 
Municipalities: Ajuy, Balasan, Banate, Barotac Viejo, Calinog, Carles, Concepcion, Dueñas, Estancia, Passi, San Dionisio, Sara, Anilao (re-established 1939), Lemery (re-established 1947), Batad (re-established 1949), San Enrique (re-established 1957), San Rafael (established 1969)

At-Large (defunct)

1943–1944 
 Includes Guimaras but excludes Iloilo City

1984–1986 
 Includes Guimaras and Iloilo City

See also 
Legislative district of Guimaras
Legislative district of Iloilo City

References 

Iloilo
Politics of Iloilo